In solid state physics the electronic specific heat, sometimes called the electron heat capacity, is the specific heat of an electron gas. Heat is transported by phonons and by free electrons in solids. For pure metals, however, the electronic contributions dominate in the thermal conductivity. In impure metals, the electron mean free path is reduced by collisions with impurities, and the phonon contribution may be comparable with the electronic contribution.

Introduction 

This problem seemed insoluble prior to the development of quantum mechanics. This paradox was solved by Arnold Sommerfeld after the discovery of the Pauli exclusion principle, who recognised that the replacement of the Boltzmann distribution with the Fermi–Dirac distribution was required and incorporated it in the free electron model.

Derivation within the free electron model

Internal energy 
When a metallic system is heated from absolute zero, not every electron gains an energy  as equipartition dictates. Electrons, in contrast to a classical gas, can only move into free states in their energetic neighbourhood.
The one-electron energy levels are specified by the wave vector  through the relation  with  the electron mass. This relation separates the occupied energy states from the unoccupied ones and corresponds to the spherical surface in k-space. As  the ground state distribution becomes:

where
 is the Fermi–Dirac distribution
 is the energy of the energy level corresponding to the ground state
 is the ground state energy in the limit , which thus still deviates from the true ground state energy.

This implies that the ground state is the only occupied state for electrons in the limit , the  takes the Pauli exclusion principle into account. The internal energy  of a system within the free electron model is given by the sum over one-electron levels times the mean number of electrons in that level:

where the factor of 2 accounts for the spin up and spin down states of the electron.

Reduced internal energy and electron density 

where  is the volume of the system.

For the reduced internal energy  the expression for  can be rewritten as:

and the expression for the electron density  can be written as:

The integrals above can be evaluated using the fact that the dependence of the integrals on  can be changed to dependence on  through the relation for the electronic energy when described as free particles, which yields for an arbitrary function :

with 
Using the expressions above the integrals can be rewritten as:

The expressions become:

For the ground state configuration the first terms (the integrals) of the expressions above yield the internal energy and electron density of the ground state. Substituting this into the expression for the internal energy, one finds the following expression:

Final expression  
The contributions of electrons within the free electron model is given by:

, for free electrons : 

This explains the absence of an electronic contribution to the heat capacity as measured experimentally.

In this notation, the electron heat capacity becomes:

 and for free electrons :  using the definition for the Fermi energy with  the Fermi temperature.

Comparison with experimental results for the heat capacity of metals 
For temperatures below both the Debye temperature  and the Fermi temperature  the heat capacity of metals can be written as a sum of electron and phonon contributions that are linear and cubic respectively: . The coefficient  can be calculated and determined experimentally. We report this value below:

The free electrons in a metal do not usually lead to a strong deviation from the Dulong–Petit law at high temperatures. The deviation of the approximated and experimentally determined electronic contribution to the heat capacity of a metal is not too large. A few metals deviate significantly from this approximated prediction. Measurements indicate that these errors are associated with the electron mass being somehow changed in the metal, for the calculation of the electron heat capacity the effective mass of an electron should be considered instead. For Fe and Co the large deviations are attributed to the partially filled d-shells of these transition metals, whose d-bands lie at the Fermi energy.
The alkali metals are expected to have the best agreement with the free electron model since these metals only one s-electron outside a closed shell. However even sodium, which is considered to be the closest to a free electron metal, is determined to have a  more than 25 per cent higher than expected from the theory.

Certain effects influence the deviation from the approximation:
 The interaction of the conduction electrons with the periodic potential of the rigid crystal lattice is neglected.
 The interaction of the conduction electrons with phonons is also neglected. This interaction causes changes in the effective mass of the electron and therefore it affects the electron energy.
 The interaction of the conduction electrons with themselves is also ignored. A moving electron causes an inertial reaction in the surrounding electron gas.

Superconductors 

Superconductivity occurs in many metallic elements of the periodic system and also in alloys, intermetallic compounds, and doped semiconductors. This effect occurs upon cooling the material. The entropy decreases on cooling below the critical temperature  for superconductivity which indicates that the superconducting state is more ordered than the normal state. The entropy change is small, this must mean that only a very small fraction of electrons participate in the transition to the superconducting state but, the electronic contribution to the heat capacity changes drastically. There is a sharp jump of the heat capacity at the critical temperature while for the temperatures above the critical temperature the heat capacity is linear with temperature.

Derivation 
The calculation of the electron heat capacity for super conductors can be done in the BCS theory. The entropy of a system of fermionic quasiparticles, in this case Cooper pairs, is:

where  is the Fermi–Dirac distribution  with 
and
  is the particle energy with respect to the Fermi energy 
  the energy gap parameter where  and  represents the probability that a Cooper pair is occupied or unoccupied respectively.

The last two terms can be calculated:

Characteristic behaviour for superconductors 
To examine the typical behaviour of the electron heat capacity for species that can transition to the superconducting state, three regions must be defined:

 Above the critical temperature  
 At the critical temperature  
 Below the critical temperature

Superconductors at T > T c 
For  it holds that  and the electron heat capacity becomes:

This is just the result for a normal metal derived in the section above, as expected since a superconductor behaves as a normal conductor above the critical temperature.

Superconductors at T < T c 
For  the electron heat capacity for super conductors exhibits an exponential decay of the form:

Superconductors at T = T c 
At the critical temperature the heat capacity is discontinuous. This discontinuity in the heat capacity indicates that the transition for a material from normal conducting to superconducting is a second order phase transition.

See also 
 Drude model
 Fermi–Dirac statistics 
 Thermal effective mass
 Effective mass
 Superconductivity
 BCS theory

References 

General references:

Condensed matter physics
Thermodynamic properties